Squak Glacier is located on the southeast slopes of Mount Baker in the North Cascades of the U.S. state of Washington. Squak Glacier is connected to Easton Glacier to the east and Talum Glaciers to the west. Between 1850 and 1950, Squak Glacier retreated . During a cooler and wetter period from 1950 to 1979, the glacier advanced  but between 1980 and 2006 retreated back .

See also 
List of glaciers in the United States

References 

Glaciers of Mount Baker
Glaciers of Washington (state)